Věžná is a municipality and village in Pelhřimov District in the Vysočina Region of the Czech Republic. It has about 100 inhabitants.

Administrative parts
The village of Brná is an administrative part of Věžná.

Etymology
The name is derived from the Czech word věž ("tower"). The village was probably founded near some tower.

Geography
It lies in the Křemešník Highlands.

History
The first written mention of Věžná is from 1318. Brná was first mentioned in 1542. The Church of Saint George was first documented in 1358.

Sights
The landmark of Věžná is the Church of Saint George. It was built in the Baroque style in 1733–1734 on the foundations of an older medieval building.

References

External links

Villages in Pelhřimov District